"Push th' Little Daisies" is a song by American band Ween, appearing on their third album, Pure Guava, in 1992. It was released as a single in 1993. A music video was released, featuring Dean and Gene Ween eating various foods while fooling around (with cuts to a beautiful girl) and interspersed with them performing the song. The video (which replaced the word "shit" with a sample of Prince squealing—taken from his song "Alphabet St.") and the song gained exposure after being critiqued on the MTV show Beavis and Butt-head.

The song was a hit in Australia, spending 13 weeks on the Australian Singles Chart and peaking at number 18 in August 1993. At the end of the year, it was ranked 40th on Triple J's annual Hottest 100 music poll. The song was also successful on US alternative rock radio, charting at number 21 on the Billboard Modern Rock Tracks chart.

Critical reception
The A.V. Club said, "there's something undeniable about the madness of "Push th' Little Daisies", with its roots in alternative-nation open-mindedness, pop subversion, and lots of drugs. It's crazy catchy, too, even as it's deliberately annoying." The song is mentioned in the book 1001 Songs You Must Hear Before You Die.

Track listing
 "Push th' Little Daisies" (Shitless radio edit—no shit) – 2:49
 "Push th' Little Daisies" (Happier Than Shit album version) – 2:49
 "Ode to Rene" – 2:21
 "I Smoke Some Grass (Really Really High)" – 7:45
 "Mango Woman" – 2:23
 "Push th' Little Daisies" (Funky Drummer Mix) – 2:52

Charts

Weekly charts

Year-end charts

References

1993 singles
1993 songs
Elektra Records singles
Songs written by Dean Ween
Songs written by Gene Ween
Ween songs